Æbelø (English: apple-island) is a Danish island in the Kattegat, off Funen's north coast. The island covers an area of 2.09 km2. In between the island and Funen, there are 4 smaller islands. Æbelø has 2 inhabitants in the summer, in the winter it is de facto uninhabited. Between 1938 and 1943, the owner of the island was Kaj Dindler.

There is a lighthouse on the island.

The Island is connected to Æbeløholm via a 1,5–2 km sandbar called Brådet, that is periodically submerged.

Sources
 Æbelø Aage V. Jensen Naturfond
 Nationalt Geologisk Interesseområde Æbelø
 Natura 2000-Gebiet Nr. 108 (Æbelø, havet syd for og Nærå)

Islands of Denmark
Danish islands in Kattegat
Uninhabited islands of Denmark
Geography of Nordfyn Municipality